Mike Verschuur (born 12 August 1987) is a Dutch racing driver. He won the Eurocup Mégane Trophy series in 2009 and the Renault Clio Cup Netherlands in 2006. He has also competed in other such series as Porsche Supercup. He is openly gay. His father Frans Verschuur and sister Sheila Verschuur are also racing drivers.

References

External links
 
 

1987 births
Living people
Dutch racing drivers
Eurocup Mégane Trophy drivers
Dutch LGBT sportspeople
Gay sportsmen
LGBT racing drivers
Porsche Supercup drivers
24H Series drivers